Lelant railway station is on the waterfront of the Hayle estuary below the village of Lelant in Cornwall, United Kingdom.

History

No goods sidings were ever provided at the station, but a line was laid from the station out to sidings on Lelant Wharf where traffic could be transferred between railway wagons and boats. The St Ives branch was laid using  broad gauge, but in October 1888 a third rail was added to the line from St Erth to allow  standard gauge goods trains to reach the wharf. The last broad gauge train ran on Friday 20 May 1892; since the following Monday all trains have been standard gauge.

Goods traffic was withdrawn in May 1956 and the station is now unstaffed. The original wooden station building is now a private dwelling and has been extended in a sympathetic style. The village is at the top of the road that climbs the hill opposite the station entrance. The Old Station house was renovated in July 2009 and serves cream teas. A level crossing at the St Erth end of the platform gave access to a slipway with the crossing gates hung on granite pillars in the local style. Three of these pillars still stand by the line.

Description
There is just a single platform, which is on the left of trains arriving from St Erth.

Limited car parking is available, adjacent to the platform. The village is at the top of the road that climbs the hill opposite the station entrance.

Services
The station was served for several years by a very limited service of trains. On Sundays, the station has a very irregular service, with 4 trains each way.

Lelant is a request stop. This means passengers wanting to join the train need to signal to the driver, and those who wish to alight need to inform the conductor.

Cultural references 
In the book, "Tiny Stations", Lelant is the first station Dixe Wills visits on his tour of UK request stops.

References

External links

Railway stations in Cornwall
Railway stations in Great Britain opened in 1877
Former Great Western Railway stations
Railway stations served by Great Western Railway
Railway request stops in Great Britain
DfT Category F2 stations